Hidehiko "Hidy" Ochiai (born September 27, 1939) is a Japanese-born martial arts instructor, author, and actor. He is credited with establishing the Washin-Ryu style of karate in the United States in 1966. He was the winner of the United States Grand National Karate Championship five consecutive times. Ochiai was inducted into the Black Belt Hall of Fame twice—as Instructor of the Year for Japanese Arts in 1979 and as Man of the Year in 1980. He resides in Vestal, New York

Books authored 

Ochiai is the author of several self-defense books, and has also translated Miyamoto Musashi's The Book of Five Rings. His entire published works are:

 The Essence of Self-Defense
 Hidy Ochiai's Living Karate
 Hidy Ochiai's Self-Defense for Kids: A Guide for Parents and Teachers
 Hidy Ochiai's Complete Book of Self-Defense
 A Way to Victory: The Annotated Book of Five Rings

Magazine articles 

The following is a list of magazines that have featured Ochiai.

Martial Arts Professional, Feb. 2006, vol. 11 no. 2
Black Belt, Oct. 1991, vol. 29 no. 10
Karate Illustrated, Jan. 1984, vol. 15 no. 1
Official Karate Annual, Spring 1982
Kick Illustrated, Jan. 1982, vol. 3 no. 1
Black Belt, July 1980, vol. 18 no. 7
Official Karate, Jan. 1977, vol. 9 no. 67
Black Belt, Dec. 1976, vol. 14 no. 2
Karate Illustrated, Feb. 1975, vol. 6 no. 2
Official Karate, Feb. 1974, vol. 6 no. 33

Filmography

References

External links 

1939 births
Japanese male judoka
Japanese male karateka
Living people
People from Broome County, New York